Ninh Thế Loan Châu, stage name Ninh Cát Loan Châu (born September 15, 1973) is a Vietnamese American singer. She was first discovered in 1996 by musical director Truc Ho at Asia Production. Her real name is Ninh The Loan Châu, however she combined her parents' first names (Cát, from her father and Loan, from her mother) to come up with the stage name Ninh Cát Loan Châu. She attended Đoàn Thị Điểm elementary school and Marie Curie High School. Loan Châu came to the United States in 1991, and reunited with her family in Westminster, California.

Loan Châu is the only musically inclined person in her family. As she recalled, her first experience in front of an audience was around the age of six where she sang in front of her classmates. At the age of 8, Loan Châu began writing children songs to perform for her friends. Due to this unusual gift, the teachers in her school took notice and allowed her to be part of a group of children in the entertainment committee. Her other musical activities involved being a part of her church's choir since a very early age. Loan Châu fondly talks about this period as one of the most memorable part of her childhood. In 1995, four years after arriving in California, Loan Châu won top honors at a karaoke contest at Ritz night club in Orange County. In 1996, after a meeting with Trúc Hồ, Loan Châu signed an exclusive contract with Asia Entertainment and became one of the organization's many bright young stars. In April 1997, Loan Châu sang in her first gig in Virginia where she was paid for the first time for her singing. In 2000, Loan Châu established her own music label called "Loan Châu Music" and also signed on to sing exclusively for Thúy Nga Productions.

Solo Album

Solo DVD Videos

Điều Ước (2007)
DISC # 1

Nhạc Phim : Mối Tình Học Trò
Nói lên một thời tuổi học trò của Loan Châu tại Marie Curie và mối tình đầu ...
Rằng Thì Là (Nguyễn Đình Lợi)
Lời Quả Tim (Phạm Khải Tuấn)
Ánh Sáng Của Đời Tôi (Minh Châu)
Lại Gần Hôn Em - duet with Quang Dũng
Khúc Tương Phùng (Hoài An)
Đôi Khi Em Muốn Khóc (Lời Việt: Lê Xuân Trường)
Sa Mạc Tình Yêu
Lỡ Một Lần Trú Mưa (Lời Việt: Vũ Xuân Hùng & Kỳ Anh)
Nhạc Phim : Bên Cầu Ô Thước (Hoài An)

DISC # 2

Telephone - Duet with Don Ho
Chỉ Còn Mình Em (Huỳnh Nhật Tân)
Đợi Chờ (Lời Việt: Khúc Lan)
Chia Tay (Phạm Khải Tuấn)
Tình Dẫu Đắng Cây (Huỳnh Nhật Tân)
Em Vẫn Nguyện Cầu Vì Anh (Hoài An)
Nhạc Phim: Nhớ Ơn Mẹ  (Đinh Trung Chính)
Điều Ước (Phạm Khải Tuấn)

Chủ đề của DVD, nói lên những ước mơ của Loan Châu gỏi đến tất cả ....
Behind The Scene

Music Productions
 Asia Entertainment (1996–1999)
 Thúy Nga (2000–2007, 2019)
 Tình (2007-2011)
 Loan Châu Music (2000 - current)

References

External links
 Loan Chau Music Production Official site
 Ninh Cat Loan Chau Official Site
 Loan Chau Official blog

1973 births
Living people
People from Ho Chi Minh City
Vietnamese expatriates in the United States
Vietnamese-language singers
People from Westminster, California